Konstruktor inženjering d.d. is a Croatian construction company which was founded in 1945 as "Konstruktor-Split" in Split, Yugoslavia (today's Croatia).

Konstruktor was the first construction company in Dalmatia. Since 2006 Konstruktor inženjering d.d. is a holder of ISO 9001:2000 Certificate.

References

Construction and civil engineering companies of Croatia
Construction and civil engineering companies established in 1945
1945 establishments in Croatia
Companies based in Split, Croatia